Jiří Piroch (born 31 August 1995) is a professional Czech football player who currently plays for FK Dukla Prague. He made his Czech First League debut for FK Jablonec as a substitute in a 2–0 win against Slovan Liberec in April 2018. Piroch scored his first Czech Second League goal for Pardubice in a 3–0 win against Táborsko in the spring part of the 2016–17 season. His father, also called Jiří, played handball for the Czech national team.

References

External links

Czech footballers
1995 births
Living people
Sportspeople from Plzeň
Association football defenders
FC Viktoria Plzeň players
FK Baník Most players
FK Pardubice players
FK Jablonec players
MFK Karviná players
FK Dukla Prague players
Czech First League players
Czech National Football League players